Artavaz is a village and a summer resort in the Kotayk Province of Armenia, on the left bank of Marmarik River. The nearby village of Pyunik is also included in the community of Artavaz.

References

External links 

Populated places in Kotayk Province
Mountain resorts in Armenia